La Marina Lighthouse is an active lighthouse set in parkland on high cliffs above the Pacific Ocean, in the Miraflores district of Lima, the capital of Peru. It is one of the most famous and visited lighthouses in the country.

History
The lighthouse was originally constructed in 1900 at Punta Coles, a headland near Ilo, but in 1973 it was dismantled and reconstructed in Miraflores. It is situated in the appropriately named Parque del Faro, one of a number of popular parks above the cliffs in the city, which commemorates a century of Peruvian navigation.

See also
List of lighthouses in Peru

References

External links

Lighthouses in Peru
Lighthouses completed in 1900
Buildings and structures in Lima